Cytoplasmic male sterility is total or partial male sterility in plants as the result of specific nuclear and mitochondrial interactions. Male sterility is the failure of plants to produce functional anthers, pollen, or male gametes.

Background
Joseph Gottlieb Kölreuter was the first to document male sterility in plants.  In the 18th century, he reported on anther abortion within species and specific hybrids. 

Cytoplasmic male sterility (CMS) has now been identified in over 150 plant species. Male sterility is more prevalent than female sterility.   This could be because the male sporophyte and gametophyte are less protected from the environment than the ovule and embryo sac.  Male-sterile plants can set seed and propagate.  Female-sterile plants cannot develop seeds and will not propagate. 

Manifestation of male sterility in CMS may be controlled either entirely by cytoplasmic factors or by interactions between cytoplasmic factors and nuclear factors. Male sterility can arise spontaneously via mutations in nuclear genes and/or cytoplasmic or cytoplasmic–genetic. In this case, the trigger for CMS is in the extranuclear genome - (mitochondria or chloroplast). The extranuclear genome is only maternally inherited. Natural selection on cytoplasmic genes could also lead to low pollen production or male sterility.  

Male sterility is easy to detect because a large number of pollen grains are produced in male fertile plants. Pollen grains can be assayed through staining techniques (carmine, lactophenol or iodine).

Cytoplasmic male sterility
Cytoplasmic male sterility, as the name indicates, is under extranuclear genetic control (under control of the mitochondrial or plastid genomes). It shows non-Mendelian inheritance, with male sterility inherited maternally. In general, there are two types of cytoplasm: N (normal) and aberrant S (sterile) cytoplasms. These types exhibit reciprocal differences.

Cytoplasmic-genetic male sterility
While CMS is controlled by an extranuclear genome, nuclear genes may have the capability to restore fertility. When nuclear restoration of fertility genes is available for a CMS system in any crop, it is cytoplasmic–genetic male sterility; the sterility is manifested by the influence of both nuclear (with Mendelian inheritance) and cytoplasmic (maternally inherited) genes. There are also restorers of fertility (Rf) genes that are distinct from genetic male sterility genes. The Rf genes have no expression of their own unless the sterile cytoplasm is present. Rf genes are required to restore fertility in S cytoplasm that causes sterility. Thus plants with N cytoplasm are fertile and S cytoplasm with genotype Rf- leads to fertiles while S cytoplasm with rfrf produces only male steriles. Another feature of these systems is that Rf mutations (i.e., mutations to rf or no fertility restoration) are frequent, so that N cytoplasm with Rfrf is best for stable fertility.

Cytoplasmic–genetic male sterility systems are widely exploited in crop plants for hybrid breeding due to the convenience of controlling sterility expression by manipulating the gene–cytoplasm combinations in any selected genotype.  Incorporation of these systems for male sterility evades the need for emasculation in cross-pollinated species, thus encouraging cross breeding producing only hybrid seeds under natural conditions.

In hybrid breeding
Hybrid production requires a plant from which no viable male gametes are introduced. This selective exclusion of viable male gametes can be accomplished via different paths.  One path, emasculation is done to prevent a plant from producing pollen so that it can serve only as a female parent. Another simple way to establish a female line for hybrid seed production is to identify or create a line that is unable to produce viable pollen. Since a male-sterile line cannot self-pollinate, seed formation is dependent upon pollen from another male line. Cytoplasmic male sterility is also used in hybrid seed production. In this case, male sterility is maternally transmitted and all progeny will be male sterile. These CMS lines must be maintained by repeated crossing to a sister line (known as the maintainer line) that is genetically identical except that it possesses normal cytoplasm and is therefore male-fertile. In cytoplasmic–genetic male sterility restoration of fertility is done using restorer lines carrying nuclear genes. The male-sterile line is maintained by crossing with a maintainer line carrying the same nuclear genome but with normal fertile cytoplasm.

For crops such as onions or carrots where the commodity harvested from the F1 generation is vegetative growth, male sterility is not a problem.

In hybrid maize breeding
Cytoplasmic male sterility is an important part of hybrid maize production. The first commercial cytoplasmic male sterile, discovered in Texas, is known as CMS-T. The use of CMS-T, starting in the 1950s, eliminated the need for detasseling. In the early 1970s, plants containing CMS-T genetics were susceptible to southern corn leaf blight and suffered from widespread loss of yield. Since then, CMS types C and S were used instead. Unfortunately, these lines are prone to environmentally induced fertility restoration and must be carefully monitored in the field. Environmentally induced, in contrast to genetic, restoration occurs when certain environmental stimuli signal the plant to bypass sterility restrictions and produce pollen anyway.

Genome sequencing of mitochondrial genomes of crop plants has facilitated the identification of promising candidates for CMS-related mitochondrial rearrangements. The systematic sequencing of new plant species in recent years has also uncovered the existence of several novel nuclear restoration of fertility (RF) genes and their encoded proteins. A unified nomenclature for the RF defines protein families across all plant species and facilitates comparative functional genomics. This nomenclature accommodates functional RF genes and pseudogenes, and offers the flexibility needed to incorporate additional RFs as they become available in future.

References

External links
 Biological approaches to preventing gene flow - Co-extra research project on coexistence and traceability of GM and non-GM supply chains

Plant reproduction